Laverton North is a suburb in Melbourne, Victoria, Australia,  west of Melbourne's Central Business District, located within the City of Wyndham local government area. Laverton North recorded a population of 119 at the 2021 census.

Located on the rural-urban fringe, Laverton North is bounded by Boundary Road to the north, Derrimut Road and the Federation Trail to the west, Old Geelong Road and the West Gate Freeway to the south and Kororoit Creek to the east. It is predominantly an industrial suburb.

Demographics

In the 2011 census, 69.23% were born in Australia, 9.89% New Zealand, 4.4% Malta, 3.3% United Kingdom and 13.18% in other countries.

50.55% claimed Christianity, 30.77% claimed other or no religion, 3.3% Buddhism and 3.3% claimed Hinduism.

References

Suburbs of Melbourne
Suburbs of the City of Wyndham